Terry Fennell Blocker (born August 18, 1959) is a former Major League Baseball (MLB) outfielder who played with the New York Mets and Atlanta Braves. The 6'2" outfielder batted and threw left handed.

MLB career
Blocker was the Mets' first round selection (#4 overall) in the 1981 Major League Baseball Draft out of Tennessee State University. In his first professional season, he batted .341 with seven home runs for the Little Falls Mets of the New York–Penn League. In , he played for the Mets' minor league affiliate in Jackson, where he shared the outfield with two players who would go on to greater fame - Darryl Strawberry and Billy Beane.

In 1985 Blocker played in 18 games in the Major Leagues for the New York Mets. He got one hit in 15 at bats. He sustained a bruised tendon above his left knee in a collision with Danny Heep in right-centerfield that resulted in Terry Pendleton's inside-the-park grand slam in the fifth inning of an 8–2 loss to the St. Louis Cardinals in the second game of a doubleheader at Shea Stadium on June 9, 1985. He spent the entire 1986 and 1987 seasons in the minor leagues.

He was traded to the Braves before the 1988 season and had his most successful season playing in 66 games that season, mostly as their center fielder, and had a batting average of .212 in 198 at bats.  He also had 2 home runs, 10 rbis and scored 13 runs.  1989 was his final Major League season playing in only 26 games.  An attempt to become a pitcher did not prolong his career, and he only pitched 1 inning in his Major League career, for the Braves in 1989.

Although posting just a .205 batting average (50-for-244) with 2 home runs and 11 RBI in 110 games in the majors, he was a strong defensive outfielder. He committed only one miscue in 177 total chances for a .994 fielding percentage.

Personal
In 1995, Terry Blocker helped track down who murdered fellow Braves replacement player Dave Shotkoski. Shotkoski was murdered March 24, 1995 while walking near the Braves' hotel in West Palm Beach, Fla. Blocker went into the hard neighborhood near the hotel, found an acquaintance made when he played for the Braves in the late '80s, and started a search for the killer. West Palm Beach police confirmed Blocker helped target suspect Neal Douglas Evans.

The locals initially stonewalled Blocker, but eventually word got out that Evans was bragging about the murder. Blocker learned Evans was hiding in an alleged crack house and relayed that to police. They arrested Evans—who, police said, has a rap sheet "seven feet long"—at the house.

References

External links

Terry Blocker at Ultimate Mets Database

Living people
1959 births
Major League Baseball outfielders
New York Mets players
Atlanta Braves players
Baseball players from South Carolina
Tennessee State Tigers baseball players
Little Falls Mets players
Jackson Mets players
Tidewater Tides players
Richmond Braves players
Greenville Braves players